Melanotaeniinae the Australian rainbowfishes is a subfamily of the rainbowfishes of the family Melanotaeniidae. They are a group of small, colourful, freshwater fish found in northern and eastern Australia, New Guinea, islands in Cenderawasih Bay the Raja Ampat Islands in Indonesia and in Madagascar.

The largest Australian rainbowfish genus, Melanotaenia, derives from the ancient Greek melano (black) and taenia (banded).  Translated, it means "black-banded", and is a reference to the often striking lateral black bands that run along the bodies of those in the genus Melanotaenia.

Description
They live in a wide range of freshwater habitats, including rivers, lakes, and swamps. Although they spawn all year round, they lay a particularly large number of eggs at the start of the local rainy season. The eggs are attached to aquatic vegetation, and hatch seven to 18 days later. Rainbowfish are omnivorous, feeding on small crustaceans, insect larvae, and algae.

Australian rainbowfish are popular aquarium fish along with Pseudomugil blue-eyes, which are another small, colourful fish found in a similar range and habitats. In the wild, some rainbowfish populations have been severely affected by the aggressive introduced eastern mosquitofish (Gambusia holbrooki), tilapia cichlids, and pollution.

Classification
Melanotaeniinae is divided into seven genera:

 Subfamily Melanotaeniinae Gill, 1894 Rainbowfishes
 Genus Chilatherina Regan, 1914
 Genus Glossolepis M. C. W. Weber, 1907
 Genus Melanotaenia T.N. Gill, 1862
 Genus Cairnsichthys G. R. Allen, 1980
 Genus Rhadinocentrus Regan, 1914
 Genus Iriatherina Meinken, 1974
 Genus Pelangia G. R. Allen, 1998

As aquarium fish
Australian rainbowfish usually do best with tropical community fish, such as tetras, guppies, and other rainbowfish. However, two males may sometimes fight at breeding season if there are not enough females. Australian rainbowfish usually eat floating flakes in captivity, because in the wild they will often eat insects floating on the surface.

References

 
Melanotaeniidae